Ozark is an American crime drama television series created by Bill Dubuque and Mark Williams for Netflix and produced by MRC Television and Aggregate Films. The series stars Jason Bateman and Laura Linney as Marty and Wendy Byrde, a married couple who move their family to the Lake of the Ozarks and become money launderers. Bateman also serves as a director and executive producer for the series. The first season was released on July 21, 2017; the second season was released on August 31, 2018, and the third season was released on March 27, 2020. The first three seasons are 10 episodes each. In June 2020, the series was renewed for a fourth, and final, season consisting of 14 episodes split into two parts; the first part was released on January 21, 2022, while the second was released on April 29, 2022.

Ozark received positive reviews from critics throughout its run, with particular praise for its tone, directing, production values, and performances (particularly those of Bateman, Linney, and Julia Garner). The series has received a total of 45 Primetime Emmy Award nominations, including three for Outstanding Drama Series, with Bateman winning for Outstanding Directing for a Drama Series in 2019 and Garner winning three times for Outstanding Supporting Actress in a Drama Series in 2019, 2020, and 2022. Bateman has received two further Golden Globe Award nominations for Best Actor – Television Series Drama.

Premise
After a money-laundering scheme for a Mexican drug cartel goes wrong, financial advisor Marty Byrde proposes to make amends by offering to set up a bigger laundering operation in the Lake of the Ozarks region of central Missouri. Marty suddenly moves his family from the Chicago suburb of Naperville to the remote summer resort community of Osage Beach, Missouri. When the Byrdes arrive in Missouri, they become entangled with local criminals, including the Langmore and Snell families, and later the Kansas City mafia.

Cast and characters

Main
 Jason Bateman as Martin "Marty" Byrde, a self-employed financial advisor based in Chicago in 2007, when his business partner and he begin to launder money for a Mexican drug cartel.
 Laura Linney as Wendy Byrde (née Davis), Marty's wife and a public relations operative for political campaigns. She becomes an advance person and stager for a local realtor, and then a lobbyist for Marty's proposal to build a casino.
 Sofia Hublitz as Charlotte Byrde, Marty and Wendy's daughter.
 Skylar Gaertner as Jonah Byrde, Marty and Wendy's adolescent son.
 Julia Garner as Ruth Langmore, a young woman who is part of a local family of petty criminals.
 Jordana Spiro as Rachel Garrison (seasons 1–2; recurring season 4), owner of the Blue Cat lodge and bar and Marty's reluctant business partner; later, Ruth's business partner.
 Jason Butler Harner as Roy Petty (seasons 1–2), an FBI agent investigating Marty.
 Esai Morales as Camino "Del" Del Rio (season 1), a lieutenant for the Navarro drug cartel.
 Peter Mullan as Jacob Snell (seasons 1–2), an established local heroin producer and the area's crime boss.
 Lisa Emery as Darlene Snell, Jacob's wife and partner in the heroin business.
 Charlie Tahan as Wyatt Langmore (seasons 2–4; recurring season 1), Russ's elder son and Ruth's cousin.
 Janet McTeer as Helen Pierce (season 3; recurring season 2), a Chicago-based attorney who represents the Navarro cartel.
 Tom Pelphrey as Ben Davis (season 3; guest season 4), Wendy's brother who has bipolar disorder.
 Jessica Frances Dukes as Maya Miller (seasons 3–4), an FBI forensic accountant investigating the Byrdes' casino business.
 Felix Solis as Omar Navarro (season 4; recurring season 3), the leader of the drug cartel for whom the Byrdes are laundering money
 Damian Young as Jim Rattelsdorf (season 4; recurring seasons 2–3), a wealthy lawyer and Wilkes' right-hand man who becomes an ally of the Byrdes.
 Alfonso Herrera as Javier "Javi" Elizondro (season 4), Navarro's hot-headed nephew and presumptive heir of his cartel.
 Adam Rothenberg as Mel Sattem (season 4), a disgraced former cop turned private investigator.

Recurring
 Carson Holmes as Three Langmore, Russ's younger son, Wyatt's brother and Ruth's cousin
 McKinley Belcher III as Trevor Evans, an FBI agent and Petty's ex-lover
 Robert Treveiler as Sheriff John Nix, who is indebted to the Snells
 Kevin L. Johnson as Sam Dermody, a real estate agent in the Ozarks
 Evan George Vourazeris as Tuck (seasons 1–2; guest season 4), employee at the Blue Cat and Jonah's first friend in the Ozarks
 Trevor Long as Cade Langmore (seasons 1–2), Ruth's father and brother of Russ and Boyd
 Michael Mosley as Pastor Mason Young (seasons 1–2)
 Harris Yulin as Buddy Dieker (seasons 1–2), the Byrdes' terminally ill tenant
 Michael Tourek as Ash (seasons 1–2), an enforcer for the Snells
 Marc Menchaca as Russ Langmore (recurring season 1; guest season 2, 4), Wyatt and Three's father, Ruth's uncle, Boyd and Cade's brother and Petty's lover
 Josh Randall as Bruce Liddell (season 1), Marty's Chicago business partner
 Christopher James Baker as Boyd Langmore (season 1), Ruth, Wyatt, and Three's uncle and Russ and Cade's brother
 Adam Boyer as Bobby Dean (season 1), owner of the Lickety Splitz strip club
 Bethany Anne Lind as Grace Young (season 1), Pastor Mason Young's pregnant wife
 Sharon Blackwood as Eugenia Dermody (season 1), Sam's controlling, overbearing mother who works for her son's real estate business
 Joseph Melendez as Garcia (season 1), an enforcer for Del
 Darren Goldstein as Charles Wilkes (seasons 2–3; guest season 4), a wealthy businessman and political donor
 Nelson Bonilla as Nelson (seasons 2–4), an enforcer for Helen, and later for the Navarro cartel
 Tess Kincaid as Hannah Clay (seasons 2–4), an FBI special agent-in-charge overseeing the Navarro cartel case 
 Melissa Saint-Amand as Jade (seasons 2–3), a stripper who forms a relationship with Sam
 Pedro Lopez as Jorge Mendoza (seasons 2–3), a member of the Navarro cartel
 John Bedford Lloyd as Frank Cosgrove (seasons 2–4), trucking company owner and leader of the Kansas City Mafia
 Joseph Sikora as Frank Cosgrove Jr. (seasons 3–4), son of Frank Cosgrove and Kansas City Mafia member
 Marylouise Burke as Sue Shelby (season 3), the Byrdes' marriage counsellor
 Madison Thompson as Erin Pierce (seasons 3–4), Helen's daughter
 Bruno Bichir as Father Benitez (season 4), Navarro's priest
 Katrina Lenk as Clare Shaw (season 4), CEO of Shaw Medical, a prominent Chicago-based pharmaceutical company owned by her family
 CC Castillo as Sheriff Leigh Guerrero (season 4), the acting sheriff in the Ozarks between Nix and Wycoff
 Eric Ladin as Kerry Stone (season 4), a celebrity chef and high roller at the Missouri Belle who is an acquaintance of Ruth's
 Bruce Davison as Randall Schafer (season 4), a retired Republican Senator whom Wendy brings onto the Byrde Family Foundation board
 Richard Thomas as Nathan Davis (season 4), Wendy's estranged father
 Glenn Morshower as FBI Executive Assistant Director Graves (season 4)
 Ali Stroker as Charles-Ann (season 4), an old friend of Ruth's mother
 Verónica Falcón as Camila Elizondro (season 4), Navarro's sister and Javi's mother
 Jane McNeill as Annalise (season 4), Nathan's girlfriend and a member of his congregation
 Brad Carter as Sheriff Ronnie Wycoff (season 4), Nix's replacement as sheriff

Production

Development
Ozark is set at a modest waterfront resort at Lake of the Ozarks, inspired by the Alhonna Resort and Marina, where series creator Dubuque worked as a dock hand while attending college in Missouri during the 1980s. Jason Bateman was originally meant to be the sole director for the first season, but because the schedule did not enable him to have enough preparation time, he directed only the first two and last two episodes.

To make Ozark as realistic and sensible as possible for depicting money laundering, the writers for the series brought in an FBI agent who works on financial crimes into the writers' room. They also brought in a hedge-fund manager, for information about moving large sums of money. Beam Solutions, a financial-compliance software company, considered the series' accuracy to be "both plausible and very creative."

The series was renewed for a 10-episode second season on August 15, 2017. On October 10, 2018, the series was renewed for a 10-episode  third season. On June 30, 2020, Netflix renewed the series for its fourth and final season, which consists of 14 episodes split into two parts. The first part of the fourth and final season was released on January 21, 2022. The second part of the final season premiered on April 29, 2022.

Opening credits
Graphic designer Fred Davis created a white letter "O", which is featured on a black background at the beginning of each episode. Within the quartered circle of the O are four symbols that foreshadow the main plot points in that episode. Additionally, each of these hand-drawn symbolic images is formed to represent the remaining letters in "Ozark". For example, for episode one, a kneeling man represents "Z"; a building represents "A"; a gun represents "R"; and a falling man represents "K".

Filming
Most of the shooting locations are in the Atlanta area at Lake Allatoona and Lake Lanier, rather than at the Lake of the Ozarks, because of tax breaks offered by Georgia. The film crew constructed a set in Georgia after extensively studying the Alhonna Resort property. Some scenes are filmed at Chicago locations. The series has also filmed in Georgia locations such as Berkeley Lake, Stone Mountain, Savannah, Norcross, Johns Creek, and Peachtree Corners.

The cinematography was primarily handled by Ben Kutchins for the first three seasons. The series was initially filmed with the Panasonic VariCam, and later switched to the Sony Venice for season three onwards. The series is known for its distinctive color grading, which is characterized by heavy blue hues, dim lighting, and deep shadows. Kutchins explained that the cinematography is intended to engage audiences to "[look] around the frame to see what's lurking in the shadows." From the third season onward, the series' visual style was brightened and its color palette expanded to reflect the prominent new settings of the casino and Navarro's estate.

Filming for the fourth season began on November 9, 2020, and concluded on October 8, 2021.

Episodes

Season 1 (2017)

Season 2 (2018)

Season 3 (2020)

Season 4 (2022)

Reception

Season 1
On Rotten Tomatoes, the first season has an approval rating of 70% based on 69 reviews, with an average rating of 6.8/10. The website's critics consensus read: "Ozark hasn't yet reached the same level as the classic crime dramas to which it will inevitably be compared, but its satisfyingly complex plot – and a gripping performance from Jason Bateman – suggest greater potential." On Metacritic, it has a weighted average score of 66 out of 100, based on 29 critics, indicating "generally favorable reviews".

Brian Lowry of CNN wrote, "While the fish-out-of-water concept is one of TV's oldest, Ozark carves out its own path with clever twists—including a late-in-the-run flashback explaining how the cartel came into his life—and the sheer strength of the performances." TV critic Sonia Saraiya of Variety wrote that Ozark is "smart, well-crafted, and says something," and that the series "comes together under Bateman's disarming and deceptively complex performance as Marty." Tim Dowling of The Guardian wrote "Laura Linney is, as ever, magnificent".

Alan Sepinwall of Uproxx was critical of the series' lack of humor (which he unfavorably compared to Breaking Bad) and failure to distinguish itself enough from numerous other contemporary shows about antiheroes, stating, "Your show needs something special to be worth the bother — particularly when too many shows are demanding too much patience from their viewers, with not enough reward — and Ozark doesn't really deliver the goods." Despite Sepinwall's negative assessment, however, he commended Julia Garner's performance as Ruth to be the series' highlight.

Season 2
On Rotten Tomatoes, the second season has an approval rating of 76% based on 45 reviews, with an average rating of 6.6/10. The website's critics consensus read: "Engaging and entertaining – if not particularly challenging – Ozarks descent into darker waters is kept afloat by another superb turn from Laura Linney." On Metacritic, it has a weighted average score of 59 out of 100, based on 14 critics, indicating "mixed or average reviews".

Alison Foreman of Mashable said the female characters are not just "emotional fodder" for the male characters, stating "Season 2 of Netflix's Ozark, however, champions female stories through all 10 of its episodes with an array of women that rivals the ensemble complexity of HBO's The Sopranos."

Season 3
On Rotten Tomatoes, the third season has an approval rating of 98% based on 48 reviews, with an average rating of 8.2/10. The website's critics consensus read: "Ozark finally finds its footing in a third season that ramps up the tension and shines a brighter spotlight on Laura Linney's exceptional performance." On Metacritic, it has a weighted average score of 77 out of 100, based on 12 critics, indicating "generally favorable reviews".

Season 4
On Rotten Tomatoes, the fourth season has an approval rating of 86% based on 63 reviews, with an average rating of 7.9/10. The website's critics consensus read: "Ozark hasn't gotten out clean just yet, but its mesmeric performances and taut suspense signal that the Byrde clan are as entertainingly resourceful as ever."

Part 1
The first part of the season received a score of 78 out of 100 on Metacritic based on 14 critics, indicating "generally favorable reviews".

Critics praised part 1 of the fourth season for its writing, suspense, and performances, with many singling out Linney for praise. Brian Lowry of CNN praised showrunner Chris Mundy for "impressively navigat[ing] the story from one seemingly inescapable corner to the next," writing that the season "unfold[s] with a perpetual sense of dread." Stuart Jeffries of The Guardian gave part 1 five out of five stars, praising Linney's "chilling" performance and comparing Wendy's arc to Lady Macbeth. Nandini Balial of RogerEbert.com praised the additions of Damian Young and Adam Rothenberg to the main cast, and felt Garner's performance as Ruth "will go down in history as one of the finest ever seen on television or streaming services."

Ben Travers of IndieWire similarly praised Linney, describing her performance as "bristling" and "mesmerizing", but felt that the first half of the season was "somewhat predictable" and that its suspense was "diminished by [being] Part 1." Daniel D'Addario of Variety was more mixed: he felt the series' pleasures "solely exist in the realm of plot development – or, perhaps, plot intensification," describing the first half of the season as "all incident, little drama." However, he too praised Linney – calling the character of Wendy one of the series' "few intriguing inventions" – as well as Garner, whose performance he felt was characterized by an "outsized bleakness."

Part 2
The second part of the season received a score of 73 out of 100 on Metacritic based on 14 critics, indicating "generally favorable reviews".

Cultural impact
In November 2017, it was reported that the series helped increase tourism and notoriety of the Lake of the Ozarks, but did not have a significant economic impact. In February 2018, a restaurant named "Marty Byrde's" opened in Lake Ozark, Missouri, and includes menu items inspired by the show, including "Ruth's Smoked Wings".

Accolades

References

External links

 
 
 Official series finale screenplay

2010s American crime drama television series
2020s American crime drama television series
2017 American television series debuts
2022 American television series endings
American thriller television series
English-language Netflix original programming
Ozarks in fiction
Primetime Emmy Award-winning television series
Serial drama television series
Television series about the Federal Bureau of Investigation
Television series about illegal drug trade
Television series about organized crime
Television series by Media Rights Capital
Television shows filmed in Georgia (U.S. state)
Television shows set in Missouri
Works about Mexican drug cartels
Split television seasons